Charles Alfonzo Beamon Jr. (born December 4, 1953) is a former first baseman and designated hitter in Major League Baseball.  Beamon spent parts of three seasons in the majors with the Seattle Mariners and Toronto Blue Jays.

He is the son of Charlie Beamon, a former pitcher with the Baltimore Orioles in the 1950s.

See also
 List of second generation MLB players

External links
, or Retrosheet, or Pura Pelota (Venezuelan Winter League)

1953 births
Living people
African-American baseball players
Alacranes de Campeche players
American expatriate baseball players in Canada
American expatriate baseball players in Mexico
Baseball players from Oakland, California
Gulf Coast Royals Academy players
Jacksonville Suns players
Major League Baseball designated hitters
Major League Baseball first basemen
Navegantes del Magallanes players
American expatriate baseball players in Venezuela
Omaha Royals players
San Jose Missions players
Seattle Mariners players
Spokane Indians players
Syracuse Chiefs players
Toronto Blue Jays players
Waterloo Royals players
21st-century African-American people
20th-century African-American sportspeople